Something for Nothing may refer to:

 Something for Nothing (album), by French rock band Chunk! No, Captain Chunk!
 Something for Nothing (2004 film), starring Juanita Jennings as Mrs. Lassiter
 Something for Nothing (1940 film), starring Rube Goldberg
 "Something for Nothing", a song by Rush from the 1976 album 2112
 Something for Nothing (book), a 1954 book by Robert Sheckley

See also 
 Something from Nothing (disambiguation)